The 1977 Buffalo Bulls football team represented the University at Buffalo during the 1977 college football season. Led by Bill Dando in his first season as head coach, the team compiled a record of 0–3–1.

Schedule

References

Buffalo
Buffalo Bulls football seasons
College football winless seasons
Buffalo Bulls football